Faedo is the surname of:

 Alessandro Faedo (1913–2001), Italian mathematician and politician
 Alex Faedo (born 1995), American baseball pitcher
 Lenny Faedo (born 1960), American former Major League Baseball player
 Soledad Faedo (born 1987), team handball player from Uruguay